The 2011 Saint Lucia Gold Division in association football is the 31st season of the highest division of Saint Lucian football.

VSADC won the title.

Teams

Table

First stage

Second Stage 
Following the regular stage, the top four clubs competed in a two-legged playoff series to determine the league champion. Villa Clara won the tournament and thus the 2010–11 season.

Match results

Round 1 
19 June

Round 2
25 June
Rovers United              2-2 Challengers FC             
Square United              0-1 Pakis FC                   
Northern United            0-2 VSADC                      
Lancers FC                 2-0 Big Players FC

Round 3
3 July
Rovers United              2-1 Pakis FC                   
Square United              5-3 Northern United All Stars  
Challengers FC             2-1 Lancers FC                 
VSADC                      2-4 Big Players FC

Round 4
9 July
Northern United All Stars  5-2 Pakis FC                   
VSADC                      2-1 Challengers
10 July
Big Players FC             1-1 Square United             
Lancers FC                 3-2 Rovers United

Round 5
16 July
Rovers United              2-0 VSADC                      
Challengers FC             0-1 Square United              
Pakis FC                   2-0 Lancers FC                 
Northern United All Stars  2-1 Big Players FC

Round 6
23 July
Square United               -  Rovers United              
24 July
Big Players FC              -  Pakis FC                  
VSADC                       -  Lancers FC                
Challengers FC              -  Northern United All Stars

References 

2011
2011 in Saint Lucian football
Saint
Saint